A heartbeat is one cardiac cycle of the heart. 

Heartbeat, heart beat, heartbeats, and heart beats may refer to:

Computing
Heartbeat (computing), a periodic signal to indicate normal operation or to synchronize parts of a system
Heartbeat, clustering software from the Linux-HA project
a piece of software by Edward Snowden

Films
Heartbeat (1938 film), a French comedy
Heartbeat (1946 film), an American film by Sam Wood, starring Ginger Rogers
La Chamade (film) (English title: Heartbeat), a 1968 French film by Alain Cavalier
Heart Beat (film), a 1980 American film about the love triangle between Jack Kerouac, Carolyn Cassady and Neal Cassady
Heart Beats (film), a 2007 Indian Malayalam-language film
Heartbeats (2010 film), Canadian French–English film by Xavier Dolan
Heartbeat (2010 film), a South Korean film about the illegal trade in human organs
Heartbeat (2012 film), an Austrian short film
Heartbeat (2014 film), a Canadian film
Heartbeats (2017 film), an Indian film by Duane Adler

Television
HeartBeat (1988 TV series), an American medical drama that aired on ABC
Heartbeat (British TV series), a 1992–2010 British period drama
Heartbeat (1993 film), an NBC TV film
Heartbeat (2016 TV series), an American medical drama that aired on NBC

Music

Bands 
The Heartbeats, a 1950s American doo-wop group
The Heartbeats (big band), an American jazz ensemble
The Heart Beats, a 1960s all-female garage rock band

Albums
Heartbeat (Bad Boys Blue album), 1986
Heartbeat (Curtis Mayfield album) or the title song, 1979
Heartbeat (Da' T.R.U.T.H. album) or the title song, 2014
Heartbeat (Don Johnson album) or the Wendy Waldman title song (see below), 1986
Heartbeat (G.E.M. album) or the title song, 2015
Heartbeat (Jasmine Rae album) or the title song, 2015
Heartbeat (Jeremy Rosado album) or the title song, 2015
Heartbeat (The Oak Ridge Boys album), 1987
Heartbeat (Ruby Lin album) or the title song, 1999
Heartbeat (Ryuichi Sakamoto album) or the title song (see below), 1991
Heartbeat (Sarah Engels album) or the title song, 2011
Heartbeat - It's a Lovebeat by The DeFranco Family, or the title song, 1973
Heartbeat: The Abbreviated King Crimson or the title song (see below), 1991
The Heartbeat (Bellarive album), 2012
Heart Beat (Wang Leehom album) or the title song, 2008
Heartbeats – Chris Rea's Greatest Hits, 2005
Heart Beats (Dami Im album), 2014
Heart Beats (Danny album), 2007
Heart Beats (Keystone Trio album), 1995
Heartbeat, by Chris & Cosey, 1981
Heart Beat, by Space Tribe, 2002
Heartbeats, by Grum, 2010

Songs
"Heartbeat" (2PM song), 2009
"Heartbeat" (Annie song), 2004
"Heartbeat" (BTS song), 2019
"Heartbeat" (Buddy Holly song), 1958
"Heartbeat" (Can-linn song), 2014
"Heartbeat" (Carrie Underwood song), 2015
"Heartbeat" (Childish Gambino song), 2011
"Heartbeat" (Enrique Iglesias song), 2010
"Heartbeat" (The Fray song), 2011
"Heartbeat" (Girlfriend song), 1993
"Heartbeat" (Wendy Waldman song), 1982; covered by Helen Reddy, 1983 and Don Johnson, 1986
"Heartbeat" (Jimmy Somerville song), 1995
"Heartbeat" (Justs song), 2016
"Heartbeat" (King Crimson song), 1982
"Heartbeat" (Late of the Pier song), 2008
"Heartbeat" (Margaret song), 2015
"Heartbeat" (Nina Sky song), 2012
"Heartbeat" (Nneka song), 2008
"Heartbeat" (Richard Orlinski and Eva Simons song), 2016
"Heartbeat" (The Runaways song), 1977
"Heartbeat" (Scouting for Girls song), 2008
"Heartbeat" (Steps song), 1998
"Heartbeat" (Taana Gardner song), 1981 
"Heartbeat" (Wilkinson song), 2013
"Heartbeat" (Wire song), 1978; covered by Big Black, 1987
"Heartbeat (Tainai Kaiki II)", by Ryuichi Sakamoto and David Sylvian, 1992
"Heartbeat Song" (The Futureheads song), 2010
"Heartbeat Song" (Kelly Clarkson song), 2015
"Heartbeats" (The Knife song), 2002
"Heartbeatz", by Styles & Breeze, 2005
"Heartbeat", by Carly Rae Jepsen from Dedicated Side B, 2020
"Heartbeat", by Christopher from Closer, 2016
"Heartbeat", by David Cook from Digital Vein, 2015
"Heartbeat", by Iyaz from Replay, 2010
"Heartbeat", by James Blunt from The Afterlove, 2017
"Heartbeat", by Leona Lewis on her single "I Got You", 2009
"Heartbeat", by Madonna from Hard Candy, 2008
"Heartbeat", by Marcus & Martinus from Together, 2016
"Heartbeat", by New Kids on the Block from Thankful, 2017
"Heartbeat", by Paris Hilton from Paris, 2006
"Heartbeat", by Plan B from Heaven Before All Hell Breaks Loose, 2018
"Heartbeat", by the Psychedelic Furs from Mirror Moves, 1984
"Heartbeat", by Red 7, 1985
"Heartbeat", by Ruby Murray, 1954
"Heartbeat", by Tahiti 80, 2000
"Heartbeat", by Vicetone, 2013
"Heartbeat", by Wham! from Make It Big, 1984
"Heartbeats", by Matoma from One in a Million, 2018
"Heartbeats", by Tom Walker from What a Time to Be Alive, 2019

Other uses
Heartbeat (novel), a 2004 novel by Sharon Creech
Heartbeat (Steel novel), a novel by Danielle Steel
Heartbeat (company), a video game developer
Heartbeat (video game), a 2018 video game created by Team Chumbosoft
Heartbeat 1521, a defunct radio station in Northern Ireland, formerly called Radio 1521
Heartbeat Productions, a British record company
Heartbeat Tour, a concert tour by Jessie J

See also
Heartbeat International
Beating Heart (disambiguation)
Hartbeat, a BBC television children's programme featuring Tony Hart
 Heatbeat, an Argentinian trance-dance band